Odorrana hejiangensis (common names: Hejiang frog, Hejiang odorous frog) is a species of frog in the family Ranidae that is endemic to China. It is found in the Yangtze River Valley of southern Chongqing and northern Guizhou, with an isolated record in western Guangxi. Its name refers to the type locality, Hejiang County in northern Sichuan. Its natural habitats are shaded hill streams and the surrounding riparian forests. Its status is insufficiently known.

References

hejiangensis
Amphibians described in 1992
Endemic fauna of China
Amphibians of China
Taxonomy articles created by Polbot